The Echo Wife is a 2021 science fiction thriller novel by Sarah Gailey.

Synopsis 
Doctor Evelyn Caldwell, an accomplished scientist researching cloning, has discovered that her husband, Nathan, has used her research to create Martine, a clone of Evelyn who is his ideal wife. When Martine kills Nathan in self-defense, Evelyn must assist in covering up the murder.

Reception 

Entertainment Weekly released the first excerpt of The Echo Wife in May 2020. David Canfield called the novel "a trippy domestic thriller which takes the extramarital affair trope in some intriguingly weird new directions."

The Echo Wife was nominated for the 2021 Goodreads Choice Award for Best Science Fiction.

Foz Meadows said of novel, "Sharply written, disturbing and thought-provoking, The Echo Wife is the kind of book that lingers with you long after you’ve finished reading it."

In a review for Locus, Gary K. Wolfe wrote that "the novel may not offer much that is new, but as a portrait of a character forced to literally confront herself for almost the first time, it’s pretty compelling," and Adrienne Martini wrote that the characters "[make] for a fine allegory but decidedly less satisfying fiction."

In a review for NPR, Jason Heller wrote that "In the book's treatment of cloning, gender dynamics, moral ambiguity, and the lofty idea of the existential nature of identity, it has a passing resemblance to some great contemporary television, including Killing Eve, Orphan Black, Black Mirror, and Westworld..."

References 

2021 American novels
American science fiction novels